The Alliance of the Forces of Progress is a political party in Senegal.

In the parliamentary election held on 29 April 2001, the party won 16.1% of the popular vote and 11 out of 120 seats. The party's founder, Moustapha Niasse, won 16.8% of the vote in the 2000 presidential election, coming in third place. Along with most other opposition parties, the AFP boycotted the  parliamentary election of 3 June 2007.

In the 2017 parliamentary elections, the party fought the election as part of the Benno Bokk Yakaar coalition, supporting President Macky Sall. The coalition won 125 seats, including a seat for Moustapha Niasse.

Electoral history

Presidential elections

National Assembly elections

References

External links

1999 establishments in Senegal
Political parties established in 1999
Political parties in Senegal